To be distinguished from Jean Le Fèvre, bishop of Chartres 1380-1389, Jean Le Fèvre de Saint-Remy and Jean Le Fevre (astronomer) 1420-1435

Jean Le Fèvre (also Jehan Lefèvre), (1493, Dijon – 1565) was a 16th-century French canon in Langres and Bar-sur-Aube.

Works 
 1536: Livret des emblesmes de maistre André Alciat ; mis en rime françoyse [by Jehan Lefèvre]
 1572: Jean Le Fèvre was the first author of the dictionary of rhymes : Dictionnaire des rymes françoises de feu M. Jean Le Fèvre ; reduict en bon ordre et augmenté d'un grand nombre de vocables, of which a reprint was made in 1587, by his nephew Étienne Tabourot, sieur des Accords, called Tabourot des Accords.
 We also owe him some translations from Italian to French.

References

Sources 
 Alexandre Cioranescu, Bibliographie de la littérature française du XVI, Paris, 1959.

Canons (priests)
French lexicographers
French translators
Italian–French translators
Clergy from Dijon
1493 births
1565 deaths